WXCT (1370 AM, "Alt 98-7") is a commercial radio station in Chattanooga, Tennessee. The station is owned by Bahakel Communications along with WDEF-FM, WDOD-FM, and WUUQ.  WXCT has an adult album alternative radio format.  The studios are located on Broad Street in Chattanooga,.

WXCT’s power is 5,000 watts.  By day, it is non-directional, but at night, to avoid interfering with other stations on 1370 AM, it switches to a directional antenna.  The transmitter is located in the Moccasin Bend district in Chattanooga.  In addition to the AM signal, WXCT is heard on 99-watt FM translator W254DB at 98.7 MHz.

History
On December 31, 1940, the station signed on as WDEF.  It originally broadcast at 1400 kilocycles and was moved to 1370 in the late 1940s. It has long been the sister station to WDEF-FM and was co-owned with WDEF-TV, before the TV station was spun off to other owners in 1990s.

On October 30, 2016, WDEF changed its call sign to WXCT.  It had been simulcast with country music station 97.3 WUUQ.

On November 14, 2016 at 8 a.m. WXCT dropped the WUUQ simulcast and changed its format to adult album alternative, branded as "Alt 93.9."  It began a simulcast on FM translator W230CN at 93.9 FM.

On September 1, 2017, WXCT changed its FM translator frequency from 93.9 MHz to 98.7 MHz, as W254DB and rebranded as "ALT 98-7."

Translator

References

External links

Bahakel Communications
XCT
Radio stations established in 1940
1940 establishments in Tennessee
Adult album alternative radio stations in the United States